Gilles Gilbert (born March 31, 1949) is a Canadian former  professional ice hockey goaltender who was drafted in the third round of the 1969 NHL Amateur Draft from the London Knights. He played in the National Hockey League (NHL) for the Minnesota North Stars and Detroit Red Wings, but most notably for the Boston Bruins.

Playing career
Gilbert played in the 1961 Quebec International Pee-Wee Hockey Tournament with the junior Quebec Aces.

Gilbert played in the NHL between 1969 and 1983 and retired with a 3.27 goals against average.

In net for the Minnesota North Stars, he surrendered Jean Beliveau's 500th career goal on February 11, 1971.

In 1973-74, he was traded to the Bruins as a replacement for Gerry Cheevers who had gone to the World Hockey Association (WHA), played in the NHL All-Star Game, and helped the team to the Stanley Cup finals that year.

In the 1975–76 NHL season, he set the NHL record for most consecutive wins by a goaltender with 17, and finished with a 33-8-10 record for a .843 winning percentage in 55 games.

From 1976 to 1980, he teamed with Gerry Cheevers to form one of the best goaltending duos in the NHL, being runners-up for the Vezina Trophy in 1980.

Gilbert recorded 17 playoff victories for Boston.  As of 2019 he ranks sixth in all-time playoff wins among Boston goaltenders.

Gilbert was the Bruins goalie during the 1979 Stanley Cup playoffs semifinal game 7 against the Montreal Canadiens, when Guy Lafleur tied the game after the infamous too many men penalty against Boston, and then Yvon Lambert scored the series-winning goal in overtime; Gilbert was still named the game's first star. Cheevers was benched after losing the first two games of the series, and Gilbert took over as the starter thereafter, overall being named the game's first star three times in the five games against Montreal. Montreal's Steve Shutt exclaimed of these performances that “Gilles Gilbert stood on his head. He was the reason they got to the seventh game”.

Gilbert was in net for Detroit on February 11, 1982, when the Vancouver Canucks became the first team with two successful penalty shots in the same game, as Thomas Gradin and Ivan Hlinka scored for the Canucks in the third period of a 4-4 tie.

Career statistics

Regular season and playoffs

Post-playing career
He currently resides in Quebec City.

References

External links

Gilles Gilbert @ hockeygoalies.org

1949 births
Adirondack Red Wings players
Boston Bruins players
Cleveland Barons (1937–1973) players
Detroit Red Wings players
French Quebecers
Living people
London Knights players
Minnesota North Stars draft picks
Minnesota North Stars players
People from Lanaudière
Ice hockey people from Quebec
New York Islanders coaches
Canadian ice hockey goaltenders
Canadian ice hockey coaches